Frederik Lauenborg (born 18 May 1997) is a Danish professional footballer who plays as a midfielder for Randers FC in the Danish Superliga.

Career
Lauenborg first appeared for the senior side of Danish Superliga club Randers on 9 July 2015 in their UEFA Europa League fixture against Sant Julià. He made his professional debut for Randers two years later on 26 August 2017 against Helsingør. He came on as a 79th minute substitute for Perry Kitchen as Randers were defeated 2–0.

Career statistics

Honours
Randers
Danish Cup: 2020–21

References

External links 
 Randers FC Profile.

1997 births
Living people
Danish men's footballers
Randers FC players
Association football midfielders
Danish Superliga players
Footballers from Aarhus
VSK Aarhus players